The Big Ten Freshman of the Year is an annual award given out at the conclusion of the Big Ten regular season to the best freshman in the conference as voted by a media panel and the head coaches of each team.

The Freshman of the Year was first awarded in 2014 and is a successor to the CCHA Rookie of the Year which was discontinued after the conference dissolved due to the 2013–14 NCAA conference realignment.

Award winners

Winners by school

Winners by position

References 

College ice hockey trophies and awards in the United States
Freshman of the Year
College sports freshman awards